James Ernest Bond (born 4 May 1929) is an English former professional footballer who played as an outside left. Born in Preston, he played in the Football League for Manchester United and Carlisle United and in the Scottish League for Queen of the South.

Bond played for Leyland Motors before transferring to Manchester United in December 1950, where he helped the club win the 1952 League title. In September 1952, he was transferred to Carlisle United, where he spent seven seasons before moving on to Queen of the South.

References

1929 births
Possibly living people
Footballers from Preston, Lancashire
English footballers
Association football forwards
Manchester United F.C. players
Carlisle United F.C. players
Queen of the South F.C. players
English Football League players
Scottish Football League players
Leyland Motors F.C. players